Charly Ngos Nouck Horneman (born 21 March 2004) is a Danish professional footballer who plays as a winger or a forward for OB in the Danish Superliga.

Club career
Horneman started his professional career in the summer 2022 where he signed a first-team contract with OB. He joined OB as a U-19 player in 2021. Before that, he played for smaller Odense clubs Næsby and OKS.

References

2004 births
Living people
Danish men's footballers
Association football forwards
Danish Superliga players
Odense Boldklub players